Lake Boga, a freshwater endorheic lake that is managed by Goulburn–Murray Water as a water storage, is part of the Victorian Mid Murray Storages, is located near  in The Mallee region of Victoria, in southeastern Australia.

During World War II, Lake Boga was used as a repair and service depot for flying boats at the Lake Boga Flying Boat Base which was established in June 1942 and closed in November 1947.

Water storage
Although operation and lake levels will vary from season to season, in general water will be harvested into Lake Boga during the winter and spring months. Subject to sufficient water to
harvest, the lake generally will be full around November to December.

In 2009, after a period of the lake being dry, water started flowing into the lake during 2010, and by 2011, the lake was one of many rivers and water storage facilities in Victoria that was flooded as a result of the 2011 Victorian floods.

See also

 List of lakes of Victoria

References

External links
 

Boga
Boga